Yana Nestsiarava (born 14 June 1992) is a Belarusian female high diver. She won the bronze medal at the 2015 World Aquatics Championships in the women's high diving. Two years later at the 2017 Championships she achieved the same result, taking bronze in the women's high diving event.

Competed in Red Bull Cliff  Diving 2022 as a neutral athlete. Reason unknown.

References

External links 
 

1992 births
Living people
Belarusian female divers
Female high divers
Place of birth missing (living people)
World Aquatics Championships medalists in high diving